Mark Municipality (Marks kommun) is a municipality in Västra Götaland County in southwest Sweden.

The municipal seat is located in the center of Kinna town.

The municipality was created through the Municipal Reform Act of 1971 by the amalgamation of eight smaller municipal entities.

Coat of arms
The coat of arms was created and granted with the municipality in 1974. The colours of Gold and Black on the shield represent power and solidity.

The grain represents the history of agriculture in the region.

The circles symbolise four cannonballs, representing the wars fought between Denmark and Sweden in the greater Mark region.

The weaver's shuttle-tool represents the historical tradition of textile workmanship in the region, which the region is famous for nationwide.

History

Medieval times 
The word Mark comes from an old documented district called Mark Härad that existed in the southern parts of the region sometime during the 13th century.

The word Mark is believed to be an old Swedish name for "border" or "edge". During the medieval times the district of Mark Härad (now Mark municipality) was situated right at the border region between the Kingdom of Denmark and Kingdom of Sweden.

Several wars were fought in the region during medieval times, and it is not uncommon that farmers accidentally unearth old remains and weapons when plowing the fields.

The fields close to Öresten Fortress have been the place for most of the relic findings. Öresten Fortress was originally built by the Danes, and the first documented nobleman to rule and inhabit the fortress was Tyge Puder (1364-1384/86). The fortress was conquered by the Swedish army during the battle of Öresten in 1470 when the Danish king Kristian the First lost the battle against Sten Sture the Oldest.

The fortress was later destroyed in early 1500 and is now a protected historical sight open to the public year-round.

In 1682, as a sign of the times, the local governance established a place of execution outside Skene village called Galgbacken (eng: The hill of hanging). Thieves were executed there as well as those judged as witches were burned on the stake. In 1934 archeologists found the buried remains of those that were executed.

The Industrial Revolution 
The Mark region was the cradle of Sweden's textile industry and has since the late 18th century been known as the Fabric Kingdom due to the widespread textile workmanship that comes from the region. It was from Mark that several of the nationwide travelling salesmen were based, spreading high-quality fabric manufacturing throughout the county. The region later evolved into a national industrial center for sewing, dyeing and textile manufacturing after the industrial revolution.

The biggest textile factories of the time was Kungsfors Textilfabrik in central Skene, Fritsla Textilfabrik in Fritsla, Rydal Textilfabrik in Rydal. As of 2014 none of those factories remain in use but the old factory in Rydal has been converted into a museum for the regions textile and entrepreneur heritage.

Modern era 
In 1971 Mark Municipality was created out of a consolidation of eight smaller municipalities. The common name given to the municipality was Mark, signifying the historical events taken place which is also manifested in its shield.

During the early 1980s most of the textile factories had disappeared and only a few remained.

Today there are only three major textile and dyeing factories remaining: Almedahls (central Kinna), Ekelund (central Horred), Ludvig Svensson (outskirts of Kinna).

Throughout Mark municipality the textile heritage has been preserved and the region is famous for its textile "know-how" and specialist production. The region is home to Sweden's largest manufacturer of fire hoses, bulletproof materials and filtering equipment.

Roads and communications 
Mark Municipality has excellent roads, rail and public transport links to the major cities in the country.

Within 1 hour it is possible to travel to Gothenburg (swe: Göteborg - Sweden's 2nd largest city) by car or bus from the stations in Kinna and Skene.

Major roads 
 Road R156 - west to Göteborg (eng:Gothenburg) / east to Svenljunga.
 Road R41   - north to Borås / south to Varberg.

Public transport (bus & train) 
All public transport options are trafficked by the regional Västtrafik (eng: West traffic) company.

 Bus 300 & 330 on the West-East route Gothenburg-Sätila-Skene-Kinna.
 Bus 450 on the Northern route Skene-Borås.
 Train on the North-South route Borås-Kinna-Skene-Varberg

Towns and villages

Major towns 
 Kinna (municipal seat)

Minor towns 
 Örby 
 Fritsla

Villages 

 Berghem
 Björketorp
 Fotskäl
 Haby
 Hajom
 Horred
 Hyssna
 Istorp
 Kinnaström
 Rydal
 Skephult
 Sätila
 Torestorp
 Tostared
 Älekulla
 Öxabäck

International sister cities 
Mark Municipality has three sister cities. The Municipality has been focusing on finding sister cities that shares a tradition in textile manufacturing.

Apolda (Germany) - since 1994.
Szamotuły (Poland) - since 1988. Friendly ties were created because of the awakened awareness of nuclear power in Szamotuły, who wanted contacts with Swedish cities because of Sweden's ongoing nuclear debates.
Ontinyent  (Spain) - since 2003.

Bordering municipalities 
 To the east:  Svenljunga Municipality
 To the north: Bollebyggd Municipality, Borås Municipality, Härryda Municipality
 To the south: Varberg Municipality (Halland County)
 To the west:  Kungsbacka Municipality (Halland County)

Sports and pastimes 
There are over 60 major sporting and pastime clubs throughout Mark Municipality. The major ones are:

Clubs 
Name                        (Hometown / Year - Field)

 Fotskäl Hockey Club (Fotskäl / 1972 - Icehockey)
 Skene IF                   (Skene / XXXX   - Soccer)
 Skene SoIS               (Skene / XXXX  -  Swimming & Orientation & General athletics)
 Kinna IF                    (Kinna / 1922  - Soccer & Orientation)
 Skene Motorsällskap (Skene / 1955 - Rallycross & Motocross)
 Marks Amatörradio Klubb "SK6BA" (Skene  / 1991 - Ham radio)
 Marks GK                  (Kinna / 1962 - Golf)
 Marbo BK                  (Kinna / 1969 - Basketball)

References

External links

Mark Municipality - Official site

Municipalities of Västra Götaland County